Chinta Valley is a valley and a village located  northeast of Bhaderwah town on Bhaderwah-Jai road. It is covered with thick coniferous forests from all sides with a stream flowing through it known as Chinta Nallah. A village called Thuba divides the valley from Bhaderwah.

About
Chinta is situated at the elevation of 6,500 ft above sea level in Bhaderwah tehsil (subdistrict) of Doda district. Famous Subarnag peak having Subarnag temple (10,200 ft above sea level) is only six Kilometers far through bridle path near the Bhaderwah-Chinta road. Bhaderwah Festival is celebrated every year starts from Raksha Bandan and ends on the full moon day of November in Chinta and other villages of Bhaderwah. A Govt Primary Health Center (PHC) is also located in Chinta.

Tourism
Chinta is one of the tourist destinations in Bhaderwah, Jammu and Kashmir. Chinta and Jai valleys have the favourable climate and environment for basics and training in paragliding. Paragliding is the special attraction of hilly areas but it is feasible all over the year except wet seasons. Six kilometres before Chinta Valley, on the Chinta-Bhaderwah road, a footpath leads towards the Subarnag peak, where everyone can get a sweeping view of the Chinta valley and the entire town of Bhaderwah.

Road connectivity
There are three roads which connects Jai Valley to other parts, which are as follows;

Main road

Alternate roads
There are two under construction alternate roads which are actually meant for Jai Valley known as Gandoh-Jai Road and Kahara-Jai Road but they can be used for Chinta also because Chinta is at a distance of 10 Kilometers south from Jai.

Famous food
Bhaderwahi Rajmash are very famous in Jammu region. These rajmash are grown as intercrop with maizes in Chinta Valley of Doda district.

Notes

References

Bhaderwah
Doda district
Valleys of Jammu and Kashmir
River valleys of India
Tourist attractions in Doda district
Chenab Valley